Bobtown is an unincorporated community in Menard County, Illinois, United States.

The Robinson-Bonnett Inn, which is listed on the National Register of Historic Places, is located in Bobtown.

References

Unincorporated communities in Menard County, Illinois
Unincorporated communities in Illinois